The Argenta Shamrocks were a Minor League Baseball team that represented Argenta, Arkansas in the Arkansas State League  in 1908 and 1909.

External links
Baseball Reference
Baseball in Arkansas Project

Baseball teams established in 1908
Baseball teams disestablished in 1909
Professional baseball teams in Arkansas
Defunct Arkansas State League teams
1908 establishments in Arkansas
1909 disestablishments in Arkansas
North Little Rock, Arkansas
Sports in Little Rock, Arkansas
Arkansas State League teams